Adam Krikorian (born July 22, 1974) is an American water polo coach and the head coach of the United States women's national water polo team. He coached the team to gold medals at the 2012 Olympic Games, 2016 Olympic Games, and 2020 Olympic Games. He was named the United States Olympic Committee's Coach of the Games for 2016. He won 15 NCAA national championships as player, assistant coach, and head coach at UCLA.

Family
Krikorian was born into an Armenian-American family, the youngest son of Gary Krikorian and Joyce (née Srabian). Krikorian is the younger brother of Blake Krikorian and Jason Krikorian, founders of Sling Media. Adam followed his brothers into the pool; Blake also played water polo at UCLA while Jason swam for Cal.  Blake died of a heart attack days before the 2016 Olympics began in Rio de Janeiro; Adam went back to Northern California for the funeral before returning to the Olympics.

Adam Krikorian is married to Anicia, with whom he has two children, Jack and Annabel. They live in Manhattan Beach, California.

High school and college record
Krikorian, a water polo and swimming standout, attended Mountain View High School before playing college water polo at UCLA.  During his senior year in high school, he scored 113 goals and was named honorable mention All-America. He helped his team to a National Junior Olympic championship.

He led UCLA to its first NCAA Championship in 23 years (1995). While at UCLA, Krikorian scored 76 goals and was a four-year letterwinner (1992–1995). He was named a second team All-America and All-MPSF honoree in 1995. He was captain of the UCLA team in 1994 and 1995. He was inducted into the UCLA Athletics Hall of Fame in 2016.

Coaching career

College

Krikorian became an assistant coach for the UCLA men's water polo team in 1996 and then also the women's water polo team in 1997.  During his coaching career, his teams won 15 national championships, 11 as a head coach, three as an assistant coach and one as a player. He was awarded the 2004 national men's water polo coach of the year and the 2001, 2005, 2006 and 2007 national women's water polo coach of the year.

The 2007 women's title was UCLA's 100th NCAA championship, the first school in history to achieve the milestone. The 2008 women's team had a perfect 33-0 season, including the three games at the MPSF Championship and the three at the NCAA Championship. #1 ranked UCLA beat #3 USC 6-3 for the 2008 NCAA Women's Water Polo Championship on May 11, 2008.

He is tied for first among active men's water polo coaches in NCAA championships won and led both teams to national titles in the same season 3 times (’99-’00, ’00-’01, ’04-’05).  As men’s head coach, he coached 25 All-America selections.

Krikorian has coached five Peter J. Cutino Award winners: Sean Kern (2000 and 2001), Coralie Simmons (2001), Natalie Golda (2005), Kelly Rulon (2007), and Courtney Mathewson (2008). The award is given to the outstanding female and male collegiate water polo players each year. For the 2007–08 season, he captured the NCAA Division I Coach of the Year honor for the fifth time as UCLA's head women's water polo coach, given by the Association of Collegiate Water Polo Coaches (ACWPC). "Krikorian led the UCLA women's water polo program to its 11th national championship – the seventh national title in his 10-year tenure as head coach. UCLA registered its second undefeated season in the last four years, posting a 33-0 overall record and perfect 12-0 MPSF mark," according to the UCLA Athletic Department.

In 2009, Krikorian Was named NCAA Division I Coach of the Year for the fifth consecutive season and sixth time overall by the Association of Collegiate Water Polo Coaches (ACWPC).

International
As the head coach of the USA Women's Water Polo Team, Krikorian coached his team to the gold medal at the World Championships in Rome, Italy on July 31, 2009, defeating Canada, 6-5.

In October 2011, Adam led the team to the gold medal at the 2011 Pan American Games in Guadalajara, Mexico. At the 2012 Summer Olympics, his United States women's national water polo team won the gold medal by defeating the Spain team 8–5 on August 9, 2012.

Krikorian coached the USA women's water polo team to the first Olympic gold medal in program history by defeating Spain in the gold medal game in London, England on August 9, 2012.

On August 19, 2016, Krikorian led the USA women's water polo team to their second straight gold medal as they defeated Italy by a score of 12-5 in Rio de Janeiro, Brazil. Ever since breaking through for its first-ever gold in 2012, the Americans have dominated this sport, winning the 2014 World Cup, the 2015 World Championships and three consecutive World League titles in China.

National Champions

See also
 United States women's Olympic water polo team records and statistics
 List of Olympic champions in women's water polo
 List of world champions in women's water polo

References

External links
 
Profile – Adam Krikorian

1974 births
Living people
American people of Armenian descent
UCLA Bruins men's water polo players
American male water polo players
Medalists at the 2012 Summer Olympics
Medalists at the 2016 Summer Olympics
American water polo coaches
American Olympic coaches
United States women's national water polo team coaches
Water polo coaches at the 2012 Summer Olympics
Water polo coaches at the 2016 Summer Olympics
Water polo coaches at the 2020 Summer Olympics
Mountain View High School alumni